John Robinson (March 20, 1831 – March 29, 1899) was a North Carolina politician who served as the third North Carolina Commissioner of Agriculture.

John Robinson was born on March 20, 1831 in Marlboro County, South Carolina. Shortly after his birth, his family moved to Anson County, North Carolina. He married twice, fathering six sons and one daughter.

In late January 1899, Robinson became afflicted by heart trouble. He died on March 29, 1899 at his home near Raleigh, North Carolina.

References 

 

North Carolina Commissioners of Agriculture
People from Anson County, North Carolina
19th-century American politicians
1831 births
1899 deaths
People from Marlboro County, South Carolina